Richard Myddleton may refer to:

 Richard Myddelton (died 1577 or 1578), MP for Denbigh Boroughs in 1542
 Sir Richard Myddelton, 3rd Baronet (1655–1716), MP for Denbighshire, 1685–1716
 Richard Myddelton (1726–1795), MP for Denbigh Boroughs, 1747–1788
 Richard Myddelton (1764–1796), MP for Denbigh Boroughs, 1788–1796

See also
Richard Middleton (disambiguation)